Nepanthia is a genus of starfish of the family Asterinidae. Members of the genus have four to seven rays and are found in the eastern Pacific Ocean, ranging from Burma and Indonesia to Australia.

Characteristics
Members of the genus Nepanthia are characterized by having four to seven rays that are narrowly flat actinally (underneath), sub-cylindrical and tapering with the marginal edge weakly angular. Pedicellariae are present as are transactinal plates and superactinal plates. The plates on the rays are not in series, there is usually a single papula per space, the spines are fine, glassy but not needle-shaped and the superomarginal plates are irregular. The type species is Nepanthia maculata Gray, 1840.

Distribution

Species
The World Asteroidea Dartabase lists the following species:
Nepanthia belcheri (Perrier, 1875)
Nepanthia crassa (Gray, 1847)
Nepanthia fisheri Rowe & Marsh, 1982
Nepanthia maculata Gray, 1840
Nepanthia pedicellaris Fisher, 1913

References

Asterinidae
Taxa named by John Edward Gray